Daniel Jacob Andelman (born May 8, 1975), known as Dan, is one of the hosts of the WSBK-TV 38 show The Phantom Gourmet and had been hosts of the WTKK Radio 96 radio show Phantom Gourmet. The Andelman brothers took over the Phantom Gourmet hosting duties from David Robichaud who left the show in their hands.  Andelman took over as CEO when his brother Dave left the company in 2020.

Other career work 
With his brothers, Dan owns the Mendon Twin Drive-In in Mendon, Massachusetts. He also appeared as one of the judges on the "Sticky Buns" episode of Throwdown! with Bobby Flay, which took place at the Cambridge location of Flour.

Personal life 
Dan is a son of greater Boston sports radio personality Eddie Andelman.

References

1975 births
Living people
American television personalities
Male television personalities
Union College (New York) alumni
American chief executives in the media industry